Alan Peter Roberts (born 1982), known professionally as Jim Noir, is an English singer-songwriter from Davyhulme, Greater Manchester. He has released five albums to date: 2005's Tower of Love, 2008's self-titled LP Jim Noir, 2012's Jimmy's Show, 2014's Finnish Line, and 2019's A.M. Jazz, as well as a number of EPs.

Biography
Noir's stage name is in homage to Vic Reeves, whose real name is Jim Moir. His early releases, including Tower of Love as well as all of the preceding EPs, were self-recorded at his parents' home in Davyhulme, Manchester.

Noir's music has been described as psychedelic pop electronica with simple, often repetitive lyrics. Noir is a multi-instrumentalist, playing all the instruments on his work. He uses a band at performances.

He played at the 2006 and 2008 South by Southwest music festival in Austin, Texas and is currently signed to Seattle-based indie label Barsuk Records in the States, and Manchester label My Dad Recordings in the UK. Noir released the single "My Patch" in the UK on 1 May 2006. Jim Noir's second album, Jim Noir was released on 14 April 2008, and Noir announced via MySpace blog that his currently unnamed third album was complete as of 14 March 2009. On 17 November 2010, Jim Noir released a new six-track EP titled Zooper Dooper.

On 17 September 2012, Noir released his third full-length studio album Jimmy's Show, composed of the best songs taken from his members-only Noir Club releases spanning the years 2010-2012.

On 21 December 2018, Noir announced via Facebook, that his new album would be named A.M. Jazz.

Commercial and pop-culture appearances

Several of Noir's songs have been featured on television programs or adapted for commercials.
 On the TV series Grey's Anatomy, the song  "I Me You I'm Your" was featured on episode "Owner of a Lonely Heart" and was also included on the Season 2 soundtrack. The show has also featured the songs "My Patch" and "Tell Me What to Do" in other episodes.
 In 2006 Adidas used a remix of "Eanie Meany" for their World Cup advertising (Josè +10, second part). The song begins, "If you don't give my football back, I'm gonna get my dad on you."
 Ginsters used "My Patch" for an ad campaign in the UK in 2006 and 2007.
 For the 2007 holiday season, Target featured a commercial in which an adaptation of Noir's song "My Patch" is playing while windows in a large Advent calendar open and close. The original lyrics, "If you ever step on my patch / I'll bring you down, I'll bring you down" were modified. In the commercial, A different singer sings "Holidays are times of magic / We're counting down, we're counting down".
 The BBC Radio 4 panel game The Unbelievable Truth uses the opening bars of "My Patch" as its theme song.
 "My Patch" was used in a trailer for the PlayStation 3 video game LittleBigPlanet, which was shown at the E3 games conference, and also as a main track in the full game. It can be heard in various levels.
 On the TV Series Life, the song "Don't You Worry" was used on episode 218 and "Happy Day Today" was used on 208.
 "Don't You Worry" was used in the movie The September Issue
 The opening bars of "My Patch" featured in an episode of Totally Jodie Marsh: Who'll Take Her Up the Aisle?
In 2009, the song "Tell Me What to Do" was featured on Ugly Betty in the episode "The Courtship of Betty's Father" (3x14).

Discography

Albums
 Tower of Love (12 December 2005) My Dad Recordings
 Jim Noir (7 April 2008) My Dad Recordings
 Jimmy's Show (17 September 2012)
 Finnish Line (November 2014)
 A.M Jazz (November 2019)
 Deep Blue View (August 2021)

Singles and EPs
 Eanie Meany EP (2004)
 My Patch EP (2005)
 A Quiet Man EP (2005)
 The Key of C (2006)
 My Patch (re-issue) (2006) No.65 UK
 Eanie Meany (re-issue) (2006) No.67 UK
 All Right EP (2007)
 What U Gonna Do (2008)
 Zooper Dooper EP (2010)
 In Hell Single (2015)
 A.M Jazz (After Hours EP) (2020)

Noir Club releases
Every month, a new EP or demo album was given away for free through the official Jim Noir newsletter Noir Club.
 Melody Junction (December 2010)
 Super Hooper Dookie Bay by The Dook (January 2011)
 Early Learnings 98 - 05 Part I (February 2011)
 Early Learnings 98 - 05 Part II (March 2011)
 Early Learnings 98 - 05 Part III' (April 2011)
 Pieces of Bob (May 2011)
 Rainbuns and Blank Ends (June 2011)
 Special Features of a Camel (July 2011)
 The Cheese of Jims Command (August 2011)
 Intermission (September 2011)
 Timepiece (October 2011)
 Light End at The (November 2011)
 For Nearby Devil (December 2011)
 Jim and the Beep Seals Live at Electric Picnic 2006 (December 2011)
 Helicopters Left (January 2012)
 The End'' (February 2012)

References

External links
Jim Noir at Barsuk Recordings
My Dad Recordings

1982 births
Living people
English electronic musicians
English male singer-songwriters
English pop guitarists
English male guitarists
People from Davyhulme
English multi-instrumentalists
21st-century English singers
21st-century British guitarists
21st-century British male singers
Barsuk Records artists